Kashmir Martyrs' Day (Urdu:   Transliteration. Youm-e-Shuhada-e-Kashmir) or Kashmir Day, was a former official state holiday observed in Kashmir in remembrance of 21 Muslim protesters killed on 13 July 1931 by Dogra forces of the princely state of Jammu and Kashmir.

On the day, Kashmiri Muslims protesting outside the Srinagar Central Jail premises, where Abdul Qadeer was being held and tried on charges of sedition, were fired upon by the state forces after refusing to disperse and entering the prison premises. The crowds buried the bodies of those killed by the state forces in the graveyard attached to the Shrine of Khwaja Bahawuddin Naqshbandi (Ziyarat Naqshband Sahab) in Srinagar, which has since come to be known as Mazar-e-Shuhada or the Martyrs' Graveyard.

The day was removed as an official holiday of Jammu and Kashmir by the Government of India in December 2019. The Government of Pakistan still marks the day.

On the other hand, some Kashmiri Hindu organisations observe the events of July 1931 as the beginning of the oppression against Kashmiri Hindus which would finally reach a peak with the exodus in 1990. For Kashmiri Hindu organisations, the "ethnic cleansing of Hindus" had begun with the arrival of Muslims rule in the region. For them, the real victims are not the Kashmiri Muslims who died on 13 July 1931 but those Kashmiri Hindus who are "victims of communal carnage".

Background 
GM Lone writes in Kashmir Life that four incidents occurring in quick succession resulted in the tragedy of 13 July:

In the first case, a businessman in Udhampur had converted to Islam. His property was taken from him and given to his brother. A suit filed was dismissed with remarks that unless he re-entered the Hindu faith, he was not entitled to any property. This was done in accordance with a decree issued by the Dogra Government on 31 December 1882.

In the second case, on 29 April 1931, Muslims were stopped from continuing with Khutbah after police intervened. Following an outburst by Mir Hussain Bakhsh related to excessive interference in religious matters by the King, a protest was held at the main masjid in the city. Following this, protests against the administration became more frequent.

In the third case, on 4 June in the Central Jail Jammu, police constable Fazal Dad Khan's copy of Panjsurah (five chapters from the Quran) was thrown away in "recklessness" by a sub-inspector. Fazal Dad approached the Mosque. The fourth incident took place in Srinagar on 20 June 1931 when leaves of the Quran were found in a public lavatory.

In his work "Inside Kashmir" date 1941, Prem Nath Bazaz writes, "The driving force behind the mass agitation till the 13th July was the discontent among the rank and file of the Muslims. [...] those who laid down their lives at the jail gate did so fighting against an unsympathetic government [...].

Abdul Qadeer 

Abdul Qadeer Khan was an employee of an English army officer, Major Butt of the Yorkshire Regiment posted at Peshawar, who was taking a vacation in Kashmir. Abdul Qadeer's place of origin is uncertain. He had been attending the protest meetings and at Khanqah-i-Maula, on 21 June 1931, he was unable to suppress his feelings, which resulted in his impromptu address to the crowd.

Rashid Taseer in his "Tarikh-i-Hurriyat", recorded his speech as:

His speech was recorded by the authorities and a few days later, on 25 June, he was arrested. He was charged with "sedition" and "wantonly giving provocation with intent to cause riot" under the Ranbir Penal Code. His trial started on 4 July in the Court of the Sessions Judge, Srinagar. During the four hearings on 4, 6, 7 and 9 July, a large number of Muslims gathered in the compound of the Court to witness this trial.

13 July 1931 

On 13 July 1931, Khan's trial continued in Srinagar Jail. Combining police and jail forces, there were about 160 policemen of various ranks. Out of these at least 31 were armed with guns. About 4000 to 5000 people had turned up to witness the trial. They were denied entry into the compound. However about 200 nevertheless entered and remained inside peacefully. Khan's lawyers spoke with the crowd, who agreed to return home after the noon prayer. At noon, Muslims lined up for prayers. Shortly after this, the arrival of officials including the District Magistrate and Superintendent of Police caused commotion. Slogans such as "Allah-o-Akbar- Islam Zindabad" and "Abdul Qadeer Zindabad" were shouted.

As the call to prayer began, Governor Raizada Trilok Chand ordered the armed police to open fire. Police directed their first bullets at the muezzin, who died instantly. Another muezzin attempted to finish the adhan and was also shot dead on the spot, after which police fired indiscriminately. Soon the police charged with batons and the people fought with stone, bats, and hand-to-hand fighting. In the commotion a gun was snatched by a member in the crowd, and he was in turn shot dead by a policeman. According to the evidence officially placed before the Dalal Inquiry Commission (Srinagar Riot Enquiry Committee), 180 rounds were fired. Seventeen Muslims were killed on the spot and forty received serious injuries, five of whom died later. According to The Hindu, the Daily Tribune dated 28 July 1931 reported the deaths of 21 Muslims in the firing.

GS Raghavan described 13 July 1931, in his book The Warning From Kashmir:

The crowds buried the bodies in the graveyard of the Shrine of Khwaja Bahawuddin Naqshbandi (Ziyarat Naqshband Sahab) in Srinagar, which has since come to be known as Mazar-e-Shuhada or the Martyrs' Graveyard.

Commentary 
Jyoti Bhusan Das Gupta, the author of "Jammu and Kashmir", wrote "[…] modern Kashmir’s 'freedom movement' was born on 13 July 1931". Prem Nath Bazaz wrote "Historically and politically, 13th July 1931 was the most important day in the annals of contemporary Kashmir. From this day the struggle for independence and freedom in the most modern sense started openly". Sheikh Abdullah compared the day with the Jallianwala Bagh Massacre. Chitralekha Zutshi however emphasized the "multi-casualty of the incident" and that the incident was "an outcome of the socio economic and socio political crisis in Kashmir".

Aftermath 
The Reading Room Party, in protest of the killings, announced a statewide shutdown. At a public meeting at the Martyrs' Graveyard, Sheikh Abdullah announced that 13 July, henceforth, would be Martyr's Day. Amidst the following unrest, arrests included those of Sheikh Abdullah and Chaudhry Ghulam Abbas.

The aftermath of 13 July resulted in Maharaja Hari Singh appointing a commission to look into Muslim grievances chaired by B J Glancy. B J Glancy was also given the task of democratizing the monarchy. This resulted in the suggestion to set up a legislative assembly which would materialize in 1934.

See also

Notes

References 

Bibliography

External links 

NC posts 1931 picture to recall Kashmir’s "struggle for dignity and identity". The Tribune. 13 July 2020.
Manu Khajuria (13 July 2019). July 13, 1931: Not Martyrs Day but Black Day for the Hindu narrative in Jammu and Kashmir. DailyO
Sanatan Dharam YMA (24 October 1931) [31 October 2020]. 1931 – A Memorandum. Kashmir Life

Jammu and Kashmir (princely state)
Observances in India
Observances in Pakistan
July observances